Czechoslovak State Railways (Československé státní dráhy in Czech or Československé štátne dráhy in Slovak, often abbreviated to ČSD) was the state-owned railway company of Czechoslovakia.

The company was founded in 1918 after the end of the First World War and dissolution of Austria-Hungary. It took over the rolling stock and infrastructure of the Imperial Royal Austrian State Railways. 

In 1930 Czechoslovakia had  of railways: the fifth-largest network in Europe. Of these 81% were state (ČSD)-owned, and the trend was to nationalize the remaining private railways. Most of the infrastructure was concentrated in the industrial regions of the Czech lands. 87% of the railroads were single-track. 135,000 people were employed on the railways: about 1% of the population.

When Nazi Germany dissolved Czechoslovakia in 1939, the Protectorate of Bohemia and Moravia formed the "Bohemian-Moravian Railway" company (in Czech Českomoravské dráhy-ČMD, in German Böhmisch-Mährische Bahn-BMB) under the control of Deutsche Reichsbahn (DR). In the Slovak State the "Slovak Railways" company (in Slovak Slovenské železnice-SŽ) was formed.

In 1945 ČSD was re-established.

After the dissolution of Czechoslovakia at the end of 1992, the company was divided into the state-owned České dráhy (Czech Railways) and Železnice Slovenskej republiky (Railways of the Slovak Republic). The fixed infrastructure was transferred to the successor countries according to location; the remainder was divided by 2:1 ratio.

Electrification
 Electrification of the railways started gradually during the 1920s. In Prague the trains used a direct current system at 1.5 kV. 
 To power the line from Prague to Chop (Чоп, Čop, Ukraine State), a direct current system using 3 kV was built after 1945. 
 To the north of this line, trains use direct current with voltage 3 kV, to the south they use alternating current with voltage 25 kV at 50 Hz. These two systems continue today.

Notes 

1918 establishments in Czechoslovakia
1992 disestablishments in Czechoslovakia
Defunct railway companies
Railway companies of Czechoslovakia
Railway companies established in 1918
Railway companies disestablished in 1992
Defunct companies of Czechoslovakia